František Halíř (born 10 May 1950) is a Czech luger. He competed in the men's singles and doubles events at the 1968 Winter Olympics.

References

1950 births
Living people
Czech male lugers
Olympic lugers of Czechoslovakia
Lugers at the 1968 Winter Olympics
Sportspeople from Jablonec nad Nisou